The Men's Downhill competition of the Grenoble 1968 Olympics was held at Chamrousse on Friday, 9 February.

The defending world champion was Jean-Claude Killy of France, who was also the defending World Cup downhill champion and Austria's Gerhard Nenning led the current season.

Killy won the gold medal, teammate Guy Périllat took the silver, and Jean-Daniel Dätwyler of Switzerland won the bronze.

Results

References

External links
FIS results

1968
Men's alpine skiing at the 1968 Winter Olympics
Winter Olympics